Mithril is a fictional metal found in J. R. R. Tolkien's Middle-earth writings. It appears in many derivative fantasy works by later authors. It is described as resembling silver, but being stronger and lighter than steel. Tolkien first wrote of it in The Lord of the Rings, and it was retrospectively mentioned in the third, revised edition of The Hobbit in 1966. In the first 1937 edition, the mail shirt given to Bilbo Baggins is described as being made of "silvered steel".

The name mithril comes from two words in Tolkien's Sindarin language—mith, meaning "grey", and ril, meaning "glitter".

Tolkien

Properties 

In The Hobbit, Thorin Oakenshield described some Dwarven treasures as "coats of mail gilded and silvered and impenetrable" and "a coat of dwarf-linked rings the like of which had never been made before, for it was wrought of pure silver to the power and strength of triple steel." A little later the narrator describes "a small coat of mail, wrought for some young elf-prince long ago. It was of silver-steel which the elves call mithril".

In The Fellowship of the Ring, the wizard Gandalf explained mithril to the rest of the Fellowship in Moria:

The Noldor of Eregion, the Elvish land to the west of Moria, made an alloy from it called ithildin ("star moon"), used to decorate gateways, portals and pathways. It was visible only by starlight or moonlight. The West Gate of Moria bore inlaid ithildin designs and runes. It is implied at one point that the "moon-letters" featured in The Hobbit were also composed of ithildin.

Abundance 

In Tolkien's Middle-earth, mithril is extremely rare by the end of the Third Age, as it was now found only in Khazad-dûm. Once the Balrog destroyed Khazad-dûm, the kingdom of the Dwarves in Moria, the only source of new mithril ore was cut off. Before Moria was abandoned by the Dwarves, while it was still being actively mined, mithril was worth ten times its weight in gold. After the Dwarves abandoned Moria and production of new mithril stopped entirely, it became priceless. 

The Tolkien critic Paul Kocher interprets the Dwarves' intense secrecy around mithril and their devotion to artistry in metal and stone as "a sublimation of their sexual frustration", given that they have very few dwarf-women and love beauty with a "jealous possessiveness", or (quoting Tolkien) "being engrossed in their crafts". 

The mining executive Danièle Barberis notes that Tolkien was born in Bloemfontein, South Africa, in a busy mining region.

There are indications that mithril was also found in Númenor and Aman.

The mithril-coat 
The most notable item made of mithril in the works of Tolkien is the "small shirt of mail" that Thorin Oakenshield gave to Bilbo Baggins after it had been retrieved from the hoard of Smaug the dragon. Gandalf stated that the value of this mithril-coat was "greater than the value of the whole Shire and everything in it".

Bilbo wore the mithril shirt during the Battle of the Five Armies. He donated it to the Mathom-house, a museum in Michel Delving. However he later reclaimed it, and took it with him when he left the Shire for his journey to Rivendell. There, some years later, he gave the shirt to Frodo Baggins when the younger hobbit embarked on his quest in The Lord of the Rings. Frodo wore the mail underneath his tunic and other shirt unbeknownst to the rest of the fellowship. The mail saved Frodo's life when he was struck by an orc chieftain's spear thrust during the battle in the Chamber of Mazarbul, and again when orc-arrows struck him while escaping Moria and while crossing the River Anduin.

When Sam Gamgee believed Frodo to be dead outside Shelob's Lair, he left the shirt with Frodo. Frodo was taken by the orcs, who fought over the shirt. Frodo was saved, but one of the orcs escaped with the shirt. In both Tolkien's and Peter Jackson's versions, the shirt was, along with Frodo's other possessions, shown to Frodo's allies at the Battle of the Morannon to imply falsely that he was imprisoned in Barad-dûr. Gandalf took the shirt and other tokens, but refused any offer of parley.

At the end of the story, Frodo wore the shirt at the celebrations and on the trip home. The shirt saved his life one last time when Saruman, who had taken over the Shire, tried to stab Frodo after Frodo spared his life.

Other objects 

Searching through the closets of Orthanc, King Aragorn and his aides found the long-lost first Elendilmir, a white star of Elvish crystal affixed to a  fillet of mithril. Once owned by Elendil, the first King of Arnor, it was an emblem of royalty there. After Elendil fell in the War of the Last Alliance, his eldest son Isildur ascended to the throne. On his journey back to the northern capital of Arnor, his retinue was ambushed by orcs. Isildur tried to escape by jumping into the river Anduin, but was killed by arrows. Saruman may have found his body there, and taken the Elendilmir from it. A replica was made and used by Isildur's successors up to the re-establishment of the kingdom (reunited with Gondor) by Aragorn. He thus used both.

Nenya, the Ring of Power wielded by Galadriel, was made of mithril.

The guards of the citadel of Minas Tirith wore helmets of mithril, "heirlooms from the glory of old days". As a result, the citadel guards were the only soldiers in Gondor who still bore the emblems of the lost kings during the days of the stewards.

As Aragorn's ships sailed up the Anduin to relieve the besieged Minas Tirith during the War of the Ring, the standard flying on his ship showed a crown made of mithril and gold.

After Gimli became lord of Aglarond, he and his Dwarves forged great gates of mithril and steel to replace the gates of Minas Tirith, which had been broken by the Witch-king of Angmar.

Greatest of all, according to legend, was the ship of Eärendil, Vingilótë, which he sailed into the sky, making the gleam of truesilver visible to the world as the Evening and Morning Star. The "Song of Eärendil", written by Bilbo and Aragorn, contains the lines "A ship then new they built for him / of mithril and of elven-glass".

Significance 

The scholar of English literature Charles A. Huttar writes that mithril was the only mineral that Tolkien invented. He notes that in Tolkien's underworld, whether the caves at Helm's Deep or the mines of Moria, "beauty and terror [were] side by side". Greed for mithril could unleash the terror of the Balrog, by digging too far down into the dark realm, but at the same time, he writes, the metal was prized for both its beauty and its usefulness, yielding the best armour. He compares the Dwarves' greed for mithril with that of the Barrow-wights for treasure, and indeed that of the dragons in The Hobbit and Beowulf for gold. In his view, these symbolise the evil "inherent in the mineral treasures hidden in the womb of Earth", just as mining and metalwork are associated with Satan in John Milton's Paradise Lost (I, 670-751). Huttar sums up with a reflection on Tolkien's moral vision in the story: just as the characters at every point have to decide for good or ill, so objects have the potential to be both good and evil: "Mithril is both the greatest of treasures and a deadly bane."

Other fiction 

The name "mithril" (also spelt mith, mithral, or mythril) is used in fictional contexts influenced by Tolkien. Mithral is mentioned in R. A. Salvatore's Forgotten Realms books on the world of Dark Elves, Dwarves, and other Underdark worlds. Mithril is a medium-tier metal in the online MMORPG RuneScape and its old school variant, as well as World of Warcraft. Mithril armour is featured in the video game series The Elder Scrolls IV Oblivion. A pastiche of the metal called "milrith" appears in the fantasy-parodying video game Simon the Sorcerer (1993), where a woodcutter is troubled by magically enchanted trees in his vicinity and needs an axehead of this supposedly hardest of all metals to practise his profession again.

References

Primary 
This list identifies each item's location in Tolkien's writings.

Secondary

Sources 

 
 
 
 

Middle-earth objects
Fictional metals